The Dudek V-1 Sportplane is a low wing, conventional landing gear, homebuilt aircraft developed from the Piper J-2 Cub.

Design and development
Dudek used a J-2 Cub purchased for $300 as a donor aircraft for the prototype. He used a scale balsa model to engineer the conversion from a high-wing enclosed aircraft to a low wing open cockpit sportsplane rather than design drawings or blueprints.

The fuselage is welded tube steel with fabric covering and wooden stringers. Landing gear was sourced from a Piper J-5. Wing struts were sourced from a Waco CG-4A.

Operational history
The first flight occurred on 11 March 1955. The prototype N35A was registered as late as 2006.

Specifications (Dudek V-1 Sportsplane)

See also

References

Homebuilt aircraft